This is an overview of the progression of the Commonwealth Games track cycling records, maintained by the CGF.

Men's records

Flying 200 m time trial

1 km time trial

Team sprint

4000 m individual pursuit

4000 m team pursuit

Women's records

Flying 200 m time trial

500 m  time trial

Team sprint (500 m)

Team sprint (750 m)

3000 m individual pursuit

4000 m team pursuit

See also

Commonwealth Games records

References

Commonwealth Games
Commonwealth Games
Track cycling